The Girl in the Café is a British made-for-television drama film directed by David Yates, written by Richard Curtis and produced by Hilary Bevan Jones. The film is produced by the independent production company Tightrope Pictures and was originally screened on BBC One in the United Kingdom on 25 June 2005. It was also shown in the United States on cable television station Home Box Office on the same day. Bill Nighy portrays the character of Lawrence, with Kelly Macdonald portraying Gina. Nighy and Macdonald had previously starred together in the 2003 BBC serial State of Play, which was also directed by Yates and produced by Bevan-Jones. The Girl in the Café'''s casting director is Fiona Weir who, at the time, was also the casting director for the Harry Potter films, the last four of which Yates directed.

The film received seven nominations at the 58th Primetime Emmy Awards, where it won Outstanding Made for Television Movie, Outstanding Writing for a Miniseries, Movie or a Dramatic Special for Curtis, and Outstanding Supporting Actress in a Miniseries or a Movie for Macdonald.

Overview
Lawrence (Bill Nighy), a civil servant working for the Chancellor of the Exchequer (Ken Stott), falls in love with Gina (Kelly Macdonald), a young woman he meets by chance in a London café. Lawrence takes Gina to a G8 summit in Reykjavík, Iceland, where she confronts the Prime Minister of the United Kingdom (Corin Redgrave) over the issue of third world debt and poverty in Africa, much to Lawrence's embarrassment and the anger of his employers. However, he realises that she is right and tries to help persuade the Chancellor and others at the summit to do something about the issues concerned.

Cast
 Bill Nighy as Lawrence 
 Kelly Macdonald as Gina
 Ken Stott as Chancellor of the Exchequer
 Corin Redgrave as Prime Minister of the United Kingdom

Production
The production was conceived to tie-in both with the BBC's Africa Lives season of programming, and with the global Make Poverty History campaign, for which writer Curtis was a prominent campaigner. As such, it was also shown in South Africa on the same day as its UK and US premieres. Curtis was better-known as a writer of romantic comedy films such as Four Weddings and a Funeral, Notting Hill and Love Actually (the latter of which he also directed and had featured Nighy). Although The Girl in the Café does contain some of his trademark comedy elements, it is generally more serious in tone and attempts to highlight the issues of poverty and fair trade.

Reception
On BBC One, the programme gained an audience of 5.5 million, a 29% share of the total television audience watching over its 90-minute duration, winning its timeslot. The opinions, however, were divided.

Andrew Anthony, for example, wrote a negative review in The Observer:

Sarah Vine, herself the wife of a conservative politician, argued in The Times that the message was devalued by an oversimplification of the problem. In her opinion the film's main weakness is the belief that the G8 leaders can simply end poverty.

However, the film gained positive reviews too with Alessandre Stanley from The New York Times stating:

There were also more positive reactions. Previewing the programme before transmission, Sarah Crompton was very enthusiastic when writing for The Daily Telegraph'':

Accolades

References

External links
 

2005 television films
2005 films
BBC television dramas
Films directed by David Yates
Films scored by Nicholas Hooper
Films set in Iceland
Films with screenplays by Richard Curtis
Primetime Emmy Award for Outstanding Made for Television Movie winners
2005 romantic drama films
British romantic drama films
2000s British films
British drama television films